Putah Creek Wildlife Area is a state wildlife area of Solano County, California. The 670 acre reserve lies to the southeast of Lake Berryessa, to the south of Monticello Dam and the confluence of Putah Creek and Cold Creek. Trees found here include cottonwood, blue oak and chaparral. Deer, quail, California towhee, Bullock's oriole, and black-headed grosbeak are also found in the area, which also includes Stebbins Cold Canyon Reserve.

References

External links
 U.S. Geological Survey Map at the U.S. Geological Survey Map Website. Retrieved January 12, 2023.

Protected areas of Solano County, California